The Botanic Garden at Oklahoma State University (100 acres) is a botanical garden and arboretum located just west of the Oklahoma State University campus, Stillwater, Oklahoma. It is open during business hours but also allows for access during the weekends.

The garden features over 1,000 species of herbaceous and woody plants apportioned between the Oklahoma Gardening studio gardens (5 acres), and turf and nursery research. Display gardens include annuals and perennials, water garden, rock garden, butterfly garden, wildscape garden, Japanese tea garden, and yearly theme gardens.

See also 
 List of botanical gardens and arboretums in Oklahoma

External links
The Botanic Garden at Oklahoma State University

Arboreta in Oklahoma
Asian-American culture in Oklahoma
Botanical gardens in Oklahoma
Japanese gardens in the United States
Protected areas of Payne County, Oklahoma
Oklahoma State University
Stillwater, Oklahoma
Tourist attractions in Stillwater, Oklahoma